Howard Choi is a physician in the United States and the principal editor of a physical medicine and rehabilitation (PM&R) handbook, PM&R Pocketpedia, and a companion book, Pain Medicine Pocketpedia. Award for Choi include the American Medical Association Foundation Leadership Award (2001) and the Foundation for PM&R New Investigator Award (2004).

Medical education
Choi graduated from SUNY Downstate Medical Center in 1997 and received a Master's in Public Health from the Harvard School of Public Health in 2004.  After completing a residency in PM&R at the Johns Hopkins University School of Medicine in 2001, Choi completed additional training as a clinical fellow in spinal cord injury medicine at VA Boston Healthcare System/Harvard Medical School.

Career
Choi is an assistant professor of rehabilitation medicine at Mount Sinai School of Medicine.

Choi is developing clinical decision-making tools that integrate evidence-based medicine, expert-based medicine and health 2.0 principles.

Publications

Books
 Choi H, Sugar R, Fish D, Shatzer M, Krabak B. PM&R Pocketpedia. Lippincott Williams and Wilkins (2003). 
 Kim HS, Fish D, Choi H. Pain Medicine Pocketpedia. Lippincott Williams and Wilkins (2011). ,

References

Year of birth missing (living people)
Living people
Johns Hopkins University alumni
Harvard Medical School people
American medical researchers
Harvard School of Public Health alumni
SUNY Downstate Medical Center alumni